

Lac de Taney (or Lac de Tanay) is a lake in Valais, Switzerland.

Geography 
The lake can be reached from Vouvry via the locality of Miex and then crossing the Col de Tanay.

To the northwest, the lake is dominated by Le Grammont and Les Jumelles.

The lake is part of the Rhone drainage basin.

The surrounding area is part of the Swiss Federal Inventory of Landscapes and Natural Monuments

See also 
 Le Grammont
 List of mountain lakes of Switzerland
 

Taney (Tanay)